Kilnwood Vale is a proposed railway station in Kilnwood Vale, Horsham, West Sussex which would serve the neighbourhoods of Kilnwood Vale and Bewbush.

The other new proposed station at North Horsham Parkway had greater support due to the predicted higher usage for future developments in north Horsham

References

Proposed railway stations in England